Phayuha Khiri is a district (amphoe) in Nakhon Sawan province, central Thailand.

History
Phayuha Khiri is an ancient city. It was at the midpoint of two larger cities, Phra Bang (today Nakhon Sawan) and Chainat Buri (today Chai Nat), the standard military route used by troops of Sukhothai and Ayutthaya.

Recently the district office was relocated to Tambon Sa Thale.

Its name "Phayuha Khiri" meaning "procession of the mountains", since the area consists of many small and large hills. Some hills are beautiful and are home to both temples and Buddha statues on the top.

Geography
Neighbouring districts are (from the north clockwise): Krok Phra, Mueang Nakhon Sawan, Tha Tako, Tak Fa, and Takhli of Nakhon Sawan Province; Manorom of Chai Nat province; and Mueang Uthai Thani of Uthai Thani province.

Administration
The district is divided into 11 sub-districts (tambons), which are further subdivided into 125 villages (mubans). There are two sub-district municipalities (thesaban tambon): Phayuha covering parts of tambon Phayuha, and Tha Nam Oi covering tambons Tha Nam Oi and Muang Hak. There are a further nine tambon administrative organizations (TAO).

Education
Phayuha Khiri is the location of Mahidol University Nakhon Sawan Campus.

References

External links
amphoe.com

Phayuha Khiri